Turkmenistan competed at the 2012 Summer Olympics in London, from 27 July to 12 August 2012. This was the nation's fifth consecutive appearance at the Olympics.

The National Olympic Committee of Turkmenistan sent a total of 10 athletes to the Games, 7 men and 3 women, to compete in 5 sports. This was the same size as in Beijing, although it had a slight difference of share between male and female athletes. Four athletes received their spots in athletics and swimming through wild card entries, while the other Turkmen athletes won their spots by participating in various qualifying matches around the world. Among these athletes, weightlifter Umurbek Bazarbaýew competed at his second consecutive Olympics. Light welterweight boxer Serdar Hudaýberdiýev was the nation's flag bearer at the opening ceremony.

Turkmenistan, however, had to wait nine more years for its first medal.

Athletics

Men

Women

Key
Note–Ranks given for track events are within the athlete's heat only
Q = Qualified for the next round
q = Qualified for the next round as a fastest loser or, in field events, by position without achieving the qualifying target
NR = National record
N/A = Round not applicable for the event
Bye = Athlete not required to compete in round

Boxing

Turkmenistan has so far qualified the following boxers.

Men

Judo

Swimming

Turkmenistan has gained two "Universality places" from the FINA.

Men

Women

Weightlifting

Turkmenistan has so far qualified three men quota places.

References

External links
 Turkmenistan - London 2012

Nations at the 2012 Summer Olympics
2012
2012 in Turkmenistani sport